A. T. Abu is a Malayalam director perhaps known best for directing the film Dhwani. He has directed eight Malayalam films to date, two of which were unreleased.

Filmography

References

External links
 

Living people
Malayalam film directors
20th-century Indian film directors
Year of birth missing (living people)